Hosnijeh (also Romanized as Ḩosnījeh; also known as Ḩosynī, Husni, and Husni) is a village in  Mehrdasht District, Najafabad County, Isfahan Province, Iran. At the 2006 census, its population was 428, in 133 families.

References 

Populated places in Najafabad County